Coryne is a genus of hydrozoans belonging to the family Corynidae.

Derivation of genus name
κορυνε ( = korune ) is a Greek word meaning "club" ( in the sense of "cudgel" or "bludgeon" ) - in reference to certain club-like organs borne by the animal.

Species

References 

 Coryne at World Register of Marine Species

Corynidae
Hydrozoan genera